Scortecci's sand gecko (Tropiocolotes scorteccii), also known commonly as Scortecci's dwarf gecko, is a species of lizard in the family Gekkonidae. The species is endemic to the Arabian Peninsula.

Etymology
The specific epithet, scorteccii, honors Giuseppe Scortecci, an Italian herpetologist.

Geographic range
T. scorteccii is found in Oman and Yemen.

Habitat

Description

Reproduction
T. scorteccii is oviparous.

References

Further reading
Baha El Din SM (2001). "A synopsis of African and South Arabian geckos of the genus Tropiocolotes (Reptilia: Gekkonidae), with a description of a new species from Egypt". Zoology in the Middle East 22: 45–56.
Cherchi MA, Spanò S (1963). "Una nuova specie di Tropiocolotes del Sud Arabia Spedizione Scortecci nell'Haudramaut (1962)". Bollettino dei Musei e degli Istituti Biologici, Università di Genova 32: 29–34. (Tropiocolotes scorteccii, new species). (in Italian, with an abstract in English).
Rösler H (2000). "Kommentierte Liste der rezent, subrezent und fossil bekannten Geckotaxa (Reptilia: Gekkonomorpha)". Gekkota 2: 28–153. (Tropiocolotes scortecci, p. 119). (in German).
Sindaco R Jeremčenko VK (2008). The Reptiles of the Western Palearctic. 1. Annotated Checklist and Distributional Atlas of the Turtles, Crocodiles, Amphisbaenians and Lizards of Europe, North Africa, Middle East and Central Asia. (Monographs of the Societas Herpetologica Italica). Latina, Italy: Edizioni Belvedere. 580 pp. .

scortecii
Reptiles described in 1963
Taxobox binomials not recognized by IUCN